Mannir Yakubu (born 15 August 1954) is a Nigerian politician who has served as deputy governor of Katsina State since 2019.

Early life 
He was born in Katsina metropolis into the family of Mallam Ladan in Tsohuwar Kasuwa Quarters.

Education 
He was brought up in katsina city and he underwent his elementary education in Rafindadi in 1961. Later on, he moved to Barewa College Zaria where he obtain his WASC. He was admitted into Ahmadu Bello University where he graduate with second class upper in Surveying.

References 

Deputy governors of Katsina State
People from Katsina State
Living people
Nigerian Muslims
Politicians from Katsina
All Progressives Congress politicians
1954 births